This list covers coalition forces in Afghanistan in 2012. See the article Participants in Operation Enduring Freedom for coalition support for Operation Enduring Freedom from October 2001 to 2003. For coalition forces involved in NATO combat operations in the past, see the articles Coalition combat operations in Afghanistan in 2006, Coalition combat operations in Afghanistan in 2007, and Coalition combat operations in Afghanistan in 2008.

Below is the disposition and structure of international military forces that were participating in the War in Afghanistan in November 2012, listing deployed units under the command of the International Security Assistance Force (ISAF), which controlled both combat and reconstruction operations (often led by the Provincial Reconstruction Teams). During its existence from 2001 to 2014, ISAF comprised units from many countries. In this article, units are assumed to be from the United States unless otherwise stated. This list is a rough and unofficial listing of units and formations.

International Security Assistance Force 

The overall command of the NATO-led International Security Assistance Force in 2012 started from Supreme Headquarters Allied Powers Europe at Casteau, Belgium. The overall command was vested in Joint Force Command Brunssum at Brunssum in the Netherlands, then the Commander ISAF (COMISAF). The COMISAF in 2012 was USMC General John R. Allen, at ISAF Headquarters in Kabul.

There were three subordinate commands under COMISAF: the Intermediate Joint Command, which controls the tactical battle along the lines of the Multi-National Corps Iraq; the NATO Training Mission-Afghanistan/Combined Security Transition Command – Afghanistan, which trains the Afghan National Army; and Special Operations Forces.

The Intermediate Joint Command in turn controlled the regional commands, roughly analogous to divisions. There were six regional commands: Capital (at Kabul), South, Southwest, North, East, and West. Each regional command had a headquarters to provide command and control and logistics support for its area of responsibility, and comprised both combat units and Provincial Reconstruction Teams (PRTs).

Regional Command Capital 
 Commander: Brigadier General Rafet Sevinc Sasmaz (Turkey)
 Headquarters: Kabul
 Area of responsibility: Kabul Province

Combat units

Provincial Reconstruction Teams 
Regional Command Capital has no Provincial Reconstruction Teams.

Regional Command South 
 Commander: Major General Robert Abrams (USA)
 Headquarters: Kandahar Airfield
 Area of responsibility: Kandahar, Orūzgān, and Zabul Provinces.

Combat units

Provincial Reconstruction Teams

Regional Command Southwest 
 Commander: Major General Charles M. Gurganus (USMC)
 Headquarters: Camp Leatherneck, Helmand
 Area of Operations: Helmand and Nimruz Provinces

Combat units

Provincial Reconstruction Teams 
 PRT Helmand (Lead nation: United Kingdom)

Regional Command East 
 Commander: Major General Bill Mayville, USA
 Headquarters: Bagram Airfield
 Area of responsibility: Ghazni,  Kapisa, Khost, Kunar, Laghman, Logar, Nangarhar, Nuristan, Paktika, Paktia, Panjshir, Parwan and Wardak Provinces and Surobi District of Kabul Province

Combat units

Provincial Reconstruction Teams

Regional Command North 
 Commander: Major General Erich Pfeffer, Germany
 Headquarters: Mazar-i-Sharif
 Area of responsibility – Badakhshan, Baghlan, Balkh, Faryab, Jowzjan, Kunduz, Samangan, Sar-e Pul and Takhar Provinces.

Combat units

Provincial Reconstruction Teams

Regional Command West 
 Commander: Brigadier General Dario Mari Ranieri, Italy
 Headquarters: Camp Arena, Herat
 Area of responsibility: Badghis, Farah, Ghor, and Herat Provinces
 Airfields: Herat International Airport, Shindand Air Base

Combat units

Provincial Reconstruction Teams

U.S.-led coalition 
In 2012, the overall command of the U.S.-led coalition effort in Afghanistan—known as Operation Enduring Freedom—Afghanistan—was headquartered at Bagram Air Base, Afghanistan, which reported to United States Central Command. OEF-Afghanistan's two major commands in 2012 were Combined Joint Task Force 101, and the Combined Security Transition Command – Afghanistan (CSTC-A). After the Stage IV transition of authority to ISAF, the status of the 10th Combat Aviation Brigade/Task Force Falcon, which handles all the helicopter combat aviation duties in Afghanistan, was uncertain, along with the exact status of Combined Task Force Sword, the engineer task force, and the Combined Joint Special Operations Task Force. It was unclear exactly what units are assigned to OEF-Afghanistan, but the operation in 2012 was in charge of counter-terrorist operations, including pursuing al-Qaeda along Afghanistan's inhospitable border region with Pakistan.

Combined Security Transition Command – Afghanistan (CSTC-A)
 In 2012, this command was responsible for training the Afghan National Army and the Afghan National Police through its headquarters and Combined Joint Task Force (CJTF) Phoenix. CSTC-A was responsible for mentoring the ministries of defense and interior, while CJTF Phoenix was responsible for mentoring Afghan National Army corps and below and Afghan National Police districts and below.  CJTF Phoenix was headquartered by the 33rd Brigade Combat Team, Illinois Army National Guard, which relieved the 27th Brigade Combat Team, New York Army National Guard in late 2008, which relieved the 218th Brigade Combat Team, South Carolina Army National Guard in early 2008. The rest of the task force was made up of National Guard and Reserve personnel from 42 states, U.S. Marine Corps reservists, active duty representatives from the U.S. Air Force, U.S. Navy, and U.S. Marine Corps, and soldiers assigned from France, Germany, Romania, Canada, New Zealand, Mongolia, and the United Kingdom.

References

External links 

 War in Afghanistan Order of Battle – Institute for the Study of War
 Troop Levels in Afghanistan Since 2001 – interactive map by The New York Times
 Marine Expeditionary Brigade-Afghanistan/Task Force Leatherneck

War on Terror orders of battle
Military history of Afghanistan
Military units and formations of the War in Afghanistan (2001–2021)
2012 in Afghanistan